The buff-throated warbling finch (Microspingus lateralis) is a species of bird in the family Thraupidae. It is found in forest borders and woodland in south-eastern Brazil. It was previously considered conspecific with the gray-throated warbling finch, and together they were known as the red-rumped warbling finch. The SACC found enough evidence to split them in 2009.

References

buff-throated warbling finch
Birds of the Atlantic Forest
buff-throated warbling finch